William Mure may refer to:
 William Mure (writer) (1594–1657)
William Mure (1718–1776), lawyer and politician
William Mure (died 1831), soldier, son of the lawyer, Rector of the University of Glasgow
 William Mure (scholar) (1799–1860), British Member of Parliament (MP) for Renfrewshire 1846–1855
 William Mure (1830–1880), British Member of Parliament for Renfrewshire 1874–1880